Billy: The Early Years is a 2008 American biographical film directed by Robby Benson. The film tells the story of the early life of  evangelist Billy Graham, played by Armie Hammer. After almost a year and a half of delays, the film was released on DVD on March 16, 2010.

World Wide Pictures, the film distribution and production company that was created by the Billy Graham Evangelistic Association, did not work on the film's production.

Plot
A reporter (Jennifer O'Neill) is interviewing Charles Templeton on his deathbed. Told through the eyes of Templeton, the film shows Billy Graham’s life as a teenager during the Great Depression living at the family dairy farm in North Carolina. During this time, Graham becomes a Christian at a tent revival meeting. Later, Graham goes to Bob Jones College, then transfers to Florida Bible Institute after being identified as a failure by Bob Jones, Sr. Following his time at Florida Bible Institute, Graham goes to Wheaton College where he falls in love with classmate Ruth Bell, whom he ultimately marries. In the 1940s, Templeton and Graham become close until Templeton's scientific skepticism causes him to lose his faith and his friendship with Graham. The film finishes with Graham inviting his listeners to accept Christ as their personal savior in his Los Angeles crusade of 1949.

Cast

Armie Hammer as Billy Graham
 Stefanie Butler as Ruth Bell Graham
Kristoffer Polaha as young Charles Templeton
Martin Landau as older Charles Templeton
Lindsay Wagner as Morrow Graham
Josh Turner as George Beverly Shea
Jennifer O'Neill as Reporter

Production

Casting
Screenwriter-producer William Paul McKay and producer Lawrence Mortorff originally wanted John Hagee to portray Mordecai Ham but director Robby Benson, concerned that Hagee's controversial public persona would cause a distraction, cast Cliff Bemis instead.

To find the lead actor, producers held talent searches in Los Angeles, New York and San Francisco.

Filming
The film was shot in Nashville and Watertown, Tennessee with a production budget of $3.6 million.

Release

Marketing
Advance screenings were held throughout the Bible Belt in Georgia, Alabama, North Carolina, Missouri, Tennessee, Florida, Kentucky, Virginia and Arkansas. Thomas Nelson published a novelization, Billy: The Untold Story of a Young Billy Graham and the Test of Faith that Almost Changed Everything, written by McKay and Ken Abraham.

Reception
Billy: The Early Years opened on October 10, 2008, less than a month before Graham's 90th birthday, grossing $192,042 in 282 theaters during its opening weekend. The film would eventually gross a total of $347,328. In response to the film's box office reception, Mortorff said that Fireproof, an evangelical film which had been released around the same time, might have unintentionally hurt the film. Mortorff also said that his team was planning a "second wave" of theatrical releases and looking forward to recovering its losses through DVD sales and TV deals.

Although Billy Graham's son, Franklin Graham, criticized the film, Gigi Graham, eldest daughter of Billy Graham, supported the film, saying that the film has the "Gospel of Jesus in there" and is "positive toward my parents and their ministry." In a review of the film, critic Roger Moore commented that a "bland leading man in a movie without much of a biographical spark to it makes for a dull sermon indeed."

A CBN review said the film had "a simple and unassuming charm about it, much like the man it honors."

Award nominations
At the Epiphany Awards, Hammer's performance received a Grace Award nomination for most inspiring performance in movies & TV.

See also
 Billy: The Early Years soundtrack

References

External links
Official website

Billy: The Early Years at Metacritic

Billy: The Early Years at Yahoo Movies

2008 films
Films about evangelicalism
2000s biographical films
Films set in the 1930s
Films set in the 1940s
American films based on actual events
American biographical films
Billy Graham
Films directed by Robby Benson
2000s English-language films
2000s American films